Kampung Jelutong is a small village in Changkat Jering, Larut, Matang and Selama District, Perak, Malaysia.

Amenities

Schools

Sekolah Kebangsaan Jelutong
Sekolah Ugama Jelutong

Shops & Services

Caltex petrol kiosk
Barber shop
Coffee shops
Motorcycle repair shop
Sundry shops
Telecom sub-station

Communities

Jelutong Mosque
Local people's hall
Camping ground

Villages in Perak